The long-tailed sibia (Heterophasia picaoides) is a species of Leiothrichidae from Southeast Asia. The species was once placed in the large family Timaliidae, but that family is sometimes split with this species being placed with the laughingthrushes in the family Leiothrichidae. The species is sometimes treated as the only species in the genus Heterophasia, with the other species being placed in the genus Malacias.

Distribution and habitat
The long-tailed sibia is found from the Himalayas through South East Asia and Sumatra. It is found in evergreen forest, oak and pine forests, secondary growth, scrub with large trees and forest edge habitats.

References

long-tailed sibia
Birds of Eastern Himalaya
Birds of Southeast Asia
long-tailed sibia
Taxonomy articles created by Polbot